Ingo Pickenäcker (born 7 April 1962) is a retired German football defender.

References

External links
 

1962 births
Living people
Footballers from Essen
German footballers
Bundesliga players
2. Bundesliga players
Rot-Weiss Essen players
Borussia Mönchengladbach players
VfL Bochum players
Rot-Weiß Oberhausen players
VfL Osnabrück players
Association football defenders
West German footballers